The DeMarcay Hotel is a historic hotel in Sarasota, Florida. It is located at 27 South Palm Avenue. On March 22, 1984, it was added to the U.S. National Register of Historic Places.

References

External links
 Sarasota County listings at National Register of Historic Places
 Florida's Office of Cultural and Historical Programs
 Sarasota County listings
 DeMarcay Hotel

National Register of Historic Places in Sarasota County, Florida
Buildings and structures in Sarasota, Florida